The Roman Catholic Diocese of Santiago del Estero is in Argentina and is a suffragan diocese of Tucumán.

History
On 10 April 1961 Pope John XXIII founded the Diocese of Santiago del Estero from territory taken from the Diocese of Tucumán.  It lost territory to the Diocese of Añatuya when that diocese was created in 1961.

Bishops

Ordinaries
Juan Martín Yáñez (1910–1926) 
Audino Rodríguez y Olmos (1927–1939), appointed Archbishop of San Juan de Cuyo
José Weimann, C.Ss.R. (1940–1961) 
Manuel Tato (1961–1980) 
Manuel Guirao (1981–1994) 
Gerardo Eusebio Sueldo (1994–1998) 
Juan Carlos Maccarone (1999–2005) 
Francisco Polti Santillán (2006–2013)
Vicente Bokalic Iglic (2013–present)

Coadjutor bishop
Gerardo Eusebio Sueldo (1993–1994)

Auxiliary bishops
Ariel Edgardo Torrado Mosconi (2008-2015), appointed Coadjutor Bishop of Nueve de Julio
Enrique Alberto Martínez Ossola (2017-

References

Santiago del Estero
Santiago del Estero
Santiago del Estero
Santiago del Estero
1907 establishments in Argentina